Arthur Hayward "Art" Keay, Jr. (19 March 1907 – 14 October 1989) was a Canadian long-distance runner. He competed in the men's 5000 metres at the 1928 Summer Olympics.

References

External links
 

1907 births
1989 deaths
Athletes (track and field) at the 1928 Summer Olympics
Canadian male long-distance runners
Canadian male steeplechase runners
Olympic track and field athletes of Canada
Athletes from Toronto